is a Japanese politician of the People's New Party, a member of the House of Councillors in the Diet (national legislature). A native of Kumagaya, Saitama and graduate of the University of Tokyo, he worked at the Ministry of Posts and Telecommunications from 1967 to 2003. He was elected for the first time in 2004.

References

External links 
 Official website in Japanese.

1943 births
Living people
University of Tokyo alumni
Members of the House of Councillors (Japan)
People's New Party politicians
21st-century Japanese politicians
Liberal Democratic Party (Japan) politicians